En Avant, meaning "forward", "ahead" or "In front" in the French language, may refer to

 En Avant (album), a 1983 solo album by French avant-guard musician Ferdinand Richard
 En Avant (anthem), national anthem of Seychelles from 1976 until 1978
 En Avant (steam launch), first steam launch on the upper Congo River, launched in 1881

 En Avant Estuaire FC, a Gabonese football club 
 En Avant Guingamp, a French football team
 En Avant Guingamp (women), a French football team